Two ships have been named MS Taras Shevchenko:

MS Taras Shevchenko (1967), a seaworthy cruise ship that operated for the Soviet Union's Black Sea Shipping Company, scrapped in 2005
MS Taras Shevchenko (1991), a river cruise ship operating for Imperial Travel, renamed to T. G. Shevchenko, in 1992